David C. Shanks (April 6, 1861 - April 10, 1940) was a career officer in the United States Army. A graduate of the United States Military Academy, he attained the rank of major general, and was a veteran of the Spanish–American War, Philippine–American War, and World War I. He was most notable for his command of the Hoboken Port of Embarkation and 16th Division during the first World War, and was a recipient of the Army Distinguished Service Medal and Navy Distinguished Service Medal.

Early life
David Cary Shanks Jr. was born in Salem, Virginia on April 6, 1861, a son of David C. Shanks (1825-1900) and Sarah Medora (Boone) Shanks (1829-1914). The elder Shanks was an American Civil War veteran of the Confederate States Army and attained the rank of colonel.

The younger Shanks was educated in Salem and attended Roanoke College, from which he graduated in 1879. He then attended the United States Military Academy, from which he graduated in 1884 ranked 33rd of 37.

Early career
Shanks was commissioned as a second lieutenant of Infantry. Assigned to the 18th Infantry Regiment, he served on frontier duty at Fort Maginnis, Montana from 1884 to 1885 and Fort Gibson, Oklahoma from 1885 to 1890. He was promoted to first lieutenant in 1890, and was the regimental adjutant at Fort Clark, Texas from 1890 to 1894. From 1894 to 1898, Shanks served as professor of military science and tactics at Virginia Polytechnic Institute.

Spanish–American War
At the start of the Spanish–American War, Shanks was assigned as mustering officer, quartermaster, and commissary in Richmond, Virginia. Responsible for organizing and training Virginia soldiers who joined the United States Volunteers, Shanks served in Richmond from May 1, 1898 to February 1, 1899. He was promoted to captain on April 26, 1898 and temporary Major in the 2nd Virginia Volunteer Infantry on June 1, 1898. He was mustered out of the volunteers on December 16, 1898 and returned to his permanent rank of captain.

Philippine–American War
In early 1899, Shanks rejoined the 18th Infantry, which was assigned to the island of Panay during the Philippine–American War. Shanks served in the city of Iloilo and remained on duty in the Philippines until October 1901. From 1901 to 1903, he served with the 18th Infantry at Fort Douglas, Utah.

From April 1903 to July 1903, Shanks served as quartermaster of the 18th Infantry in Tacloban on the Philippine island of Leyte. From July 1903 to October 1905, Shanks served with the civil government of the Philippines as governor of the province of Cavite. He was promoted to major in the 4th Infantry on November 4, 1904.

Continued career

Shanks served with the 4th Infantry at Fort Slocum, New York and Fort Mackenzie, Wyoming from November 1905 to March 1908. He then returned to the Philippines with the 4th Infantry, and he served at Camp Jossman, Guimaras from March 1908 to July 1909. From August 1909 to June 1912 Shanks served on recruiting duty at Columbus Barracks, Ohio and at Fort Logan, Colorado. On March 11, 1911, Shanks received promotion to lieutenant colonel. He served at Fort Thomas, Kentucky from 1912 to 1913.

From January to March 1913, Shanks attended the School for Field Officers at Fort Leavenworth, Kansas. He was then detailed to the Inspector General's department, and served as inspector of the Western Department from April to September 1913. From September 1913 to September 1914, Shanks served in the office of the Inspector General of the Army. From August 1914 to August 1915, he was again assigned as inspector of the Western Department. He was promoted to colonel on August 4, 1914.

Shanks served as inspector of the Philippine Department from September 1915 to June 1917. He was promoted to brigadier general on May 15, 1917.

World War I

Upon returning to the United States, Shanks was assigned as commander of the Hoboken Port of Embarkation. Responsible to plan and execute transportation of Army soldiers and equipment to France, he served in this position from July 1917 to September 1918. In August 1917, Shanks was promoted to temporary major general.

Shanks left Hoboken to assume command of the 16th Division at Camp Kearny, California. He was still organizing and equipping his command when the war ended in November 1918, which resulted in the 16th Division's inactivation soon afterwards.

After the division was demobilized, Shanks returned to the Port of Hoboken, now a port of debarkation. He had responsibility for receiving soldiers and equipment returning from France and arranging for onward transportation, and held this command From December 1918 to April 1920. Shanks received both the Army Distinguished Service Medal and Navy Distinguished Service Medal to recognize his superior performance of duty during the war. The citation for his Army DSM reads:

The Navy DSM states the following:

Post-World War I

In April 1920, Shanks was assigned to command the 5th Division at Camp Gordon, Georgia. He remained in command until August 1920, when he was assigned as commander of the First Corps Area in Boston, Massachusetts. He served in this command until September 1921, and was promoted to permanent major general in March 1921.

From July to November 1921, Shanks was assigned as commander of the 1st Division and Fort Dix, New Jersey. In November 1921, he was a pallbearer at the burial of the Unknown Soldier. From November 1921 to July 1922, he was president of the Army's Board for Examination, which determined which officers would be retained after World War I and at what rank.

Shanks commanded the Fourth Corps Area in Atlanta, Georgia, from July 1922 to November 1924. In August 1923, he was one of the pall bearers at the funeral of President Warren G. Harding.

Retirement and death
In January 1925, Shanks retired as a major general and settled in Washington, D.C. A prolific writer, he authored numerous books and magazine articles, including: Management of the American Soldier (1918); As They Passed Through the Port (1927); "Golf Stories" (Golf Illustrated, November 1928); "Indian Territory Incidents" (National Sportsman, March, April, May, 1929); "Hunting Tales of the Old Army" (Forest and Stream, 1929); and Genealogy of the Shanks Family in America (1934).

Shanks died in Washington, D.C. on April 10, 1940. He was buried at Arlington National Cemetery.

Legacy

The USNS David C. Shanks (T-AP-180) was a U.S. military transport ship. Christened in 1943, Shanks was used to move soldiers and equipment during World War II and the Korean War. The ship was inactivated in 1959 and remained in the Reserve Fleet until being sold for scrap in 1973.

During World War II, the Army established the Camp Shanks military post. Named for Shanks, it was located near Orangetown, New York, and used as an embarkation center for soldiers preparing to depart for service overseas. After the war, it was used as a processing center for prisoners of war who were returning to their home countries. Camp Shanks closed in 1946 and was used as housing for veterans until it was dismantled in 1954. Much of the site was later subsumed by construction of the Palisades Interstate Parkway and Tappan Zee Bridge. In June 1994, a museum to commemorate Camp Shanks opened in Orangetown.

In addition to his military awards, in 1921 Shanks received the honorary degree of LL.D. from Roanoke College.

Family
In October 1893, Shanks married Nancy Wright Chapman (1868-1954). They were the parents of two daughters, Katherine (1894-1960), the wife of United States Navy Captain William E. Malloy, and Sarah (1896-1975), the wife of General Stephen J. Chamberlin.

Notes

References

External links

Arlington National Cemetery
Lecture: Who Was Major General David C. Shanks? Robert Foster, Hoboken Museum Director. June 13, 2018. Via YouTube.
Camp Shanks Museum. Town of Orangetown, New York.

1861 births
1940 deaths
United States Army Infantry Branch personnel
People from Salem, Virginia
Military personnel from Virginia
Roanoke College alumni
United States Military Academy alumni
United States Army Command and General Staff College alumni
United States Army generals of World War I
United States Army generals
Recipients of the Distinguished Service Medal (US Army)
Recipients of the Navy Distinguished Service Medal
20th-century American male writers
Burials at Arlington National Cemetery